Hypercompe conspersa is a moth of the family Erebidae first described by Francis Walker in 1866. It is found in Colombia.

References

conspersa
Moths described in 1866